"Into the Blue" is a song by Australian recording artist Kylie Minogue. It was written by Kelly Sheehan, Jacob Kasher, and Mike Del Rio and produced by the latter for Minogue's twelfth studio album, Kiss Me Once (2014). The song was recorded in London, England on Minogue's 45th birthday in May 2013 and premiered as the album's first single on BBC Radio 2's Ken Bruce show on 27 January 2014. Musically, "Into the Blue" features instrumentation of synthesizers, keyboards and strings. The lyrical content talks about being independent, free and happy.

Upon its release, "Into the Blue" received critical acclaim from music critics, some of whom compared it to her 2010 single "All the Lovers". Many likened the lyrical content's uplifting theme and praised the composition, vocals and production, while critics noted Minogue retaining her classic image. Compared to the lead singles from Minogue's previous albums, it became a moderate commercial success on the charts, reaching the top ten in Ireland and Japan, and component charts in Australia, Belgium, the United Kingdom, and the United States.

The accompanying music video for "Into the Blue" was directed by Dawn Shadforth and features Minogue partying and walking down the streets of London while spending time with her on-screen boyfriend. It was released on 2 February 2014 on Minogue's YouTube account and received universal acclaim from music commentators.

Background and composition
In 2012, Minogue began a year-long celebration for her 25 years in the music industry, which was often known as "K25". The anniversary started with her embarking on the Anti Tour, which featured b-sides, demos and rarities from her music catalogue. Minogue released the compilation album, The Abbey Road Sessions in October 2012. The album contained reworked and orchestral versions of her previous songs which were recorded at London's Abbey Road Studios. The album received favourable reviews from music critics and it debuted at number two in the United Kingdom.

In January 2014, Minogue uploaded a picture on her Instagram account saying "Happy New Year #Lovers....I wish you all the best and can't wait to share new music with you in #KM2014 ❤️💋❤️#IntoTheBlue". The hashtag #IntoTheBlue was then rumored to be the title of the upcoming Minogue single or album.  "Into the Blue" was slated to be premiered on Minogue's website on 27 January, however, a Spanish Tumblr page had leaked a 30-second recording on 19 January 2014. Minogue premiered "Into the Blue" on BBC Radio 2's Ken Bruce Show on 27 January 2014. The song's artwork was unveiled the same day, featuring Minogue wearing a see-through like dress with the title overlapping her.

"Into the Blue" is set in common time with a moderate tempo of 116 beats per minute, and is written in the key of A major. Minogue's vocals span from the low note of A3 to the high note of A5.

Critical reception
"Into the Blue" received critical acclaim upon its release. Christina Lee from Idolator said "While launched by piano chords and a wash of strings, "Into the Blue" truly takes off at the seismic hook, where Minogue's crystalline voice soars over an arena-ready dance breakdown. She sounds optimistic, if not in total bliss." A reviewer from The Huffington Post gave it eight reasons why "Kylie's New Release is the Best Pop Single You'll Hear All Year". The publication praised her for trying something modern yet "classy" and said "a bona-fide [that] smack you between the eyes, instant pop classic but it manages the rare feat of getting better with every listen [...]" Perez Hilton said that, along with the video; "The songstress has done it again with this AH-Mazing hit of a song and fantabulous music video!!" Consequence of Sound was positive towards the song, saying that it is "an alluring and life-affirming pop song filled with uplifting lyrics: "When I got my back up against the wall, don't need no one to rescue me/'Cause I ain't waiting up for no miracle, yeah tonight I'm running free!"

Bernard Zuel from The Sydney Morning Herald was positive calling "Into The Blue" "a winner of a pop song which has a damn catchy, lightly brushed with electronic dance music sound that deep down is pretty much a classic Kylie Minogue pop tune." However, he also stated that while it is a solid comeback single, "it also feels a bit too safe to make much of an impact in the singles chart." Lewis Corner from Digital Spy gave a positive review of the song ahead of the UK release, saying that the song was "a move that has only served to enhance what she already does very well" and that he wants "Kylie doing more of this for a while longer yet."

Chart performance
"Into the Blue" debuted on both Ultratip charts in Flanders and Wallonia at number fifty-seven and twenty-three, respectively. In Wallonia, the song rose to number ten, Minogue's first Ultratip top ten entry since her 2010 single "Get Outta My Way". The song then followed in Finland, where it debuted at number twenty-two and eventually debuted at number sixteen in Spain. The song debuted at number seventy on the French Singles Chart, number nineteen in Hungary and number 243 on Russia's TopHit airplay chart. The song peaked inside the top ten in both Belgium charts, along with peaking inside the top five in Croatia, reaching number four.

In her native Australia, "Into the Blue" debuted at number forty-six with 2,648 sales, making it Minogue's first lead single not to debut within the top forty. The song slipped to number 96 with 1,184 sales, bringing total sales to 3,832, after two full weeks on sale, making it her most unsuccessful lead single. However, the song debuted at number 7 on the Australian Domestic Charts, until falling to number twenty in its following week. The song debuted at number sixty-six on the Japan Hot 100, rising to number sixteen the following week. On April 4, the song rose back up from number 33 and reached its peak inside the top 10 at number 8. The song debuted at number 182 on the South Korea International Digital Chart, with sales of 1,537. In the United Kingdom, the song entered the singles chart at number-twelve.

The song was released in the United States and Canada on 28 January. Following its first week sales of 4,000 digital downloads, the song debuted at number thirty-nine and forty-one on the US Dance/Electronic Digital Songs and Dance/Electronic Songs charts respectively. The song made its official debut at number fifty-two on the US Hot Dance Club Songs. In its fifth week on the chart, the song has risen to number one.

Music video
Directed by Dawn Shadforth, the music video was filmed in London in January 2014. It was released on 3 February 2014. The video features French actor Clément Sibony as Minogue's love interest.

The music video was well-received from music critics and publications. Jason Lipshutz from Billboard labeled the video "dreamy" and said "Minogue's latest visual in unapologetically glamorous, with the pop star and her on-screen boyfriend mixing lavish party life with bedroom-bound alone time and technicolor with black-and-white. There is some drama that requires Minogue's beau to run after her down a deserted sidewalk, but more importantly, Minogue does a killer robot dance move at the 1:16 mark, which is not to be missed." A reviewer from the magazine OK! Magazine labeled the video "sexy" saying "Rolling around on a bed, 45-year-old Kylie sexily flaunts her enviable figure - including her tonned pins - and locks lips with the topless hunk in some rather racy scenes [...]"

Live performances
In March 2014, Minogue performed "Into the Blue" on the Sport Relief 2014 television special, The Voice UK and Echo Awards 2014. In April 2014, she performed the song on The Graham Norton Show.
"Into the Blue" was used to close Minogue's Kiss Me Once Tour and Kylie Summer 2015 Tour.

In addition, it was one of the seven songs that Kylie performed during the Closing Ceremony of 2014 Commonwealth Games.

Formats and track listings
 7" Single
 "Into the Blue" – 4:10
 "Sparks" - 3:30

 CD Single
 "Into the Blue (Album Version)" – 4:10
 "Into the Blue (S-Man Deep Blue Remix)" — 7:35
 "Into the Blue (Patrick Hagenaar Colour Code Remix)" — 6:22
 "Into the Blue (Vanilla Ace Remix)" — 6:22

Remixes

 Roger Sanchez Mixes
 "Into the Blue (S-Man Deep Blue Remix)" — 7:35
 "Into the Blue (S-Man Instrumental)" — 7:35
 Patrick Hagenaar Mix
 "Into the Blue (Patrick Hagenaar Colour Code Remix)" — 6:22
 "Into the Blue (Patrick Hagenaar Colour Code Dub)" — 6:22
 Tracy Young Mixes
 "Into the Blue (Tracy Young Ferosh Reconstruction Club)" — 6:55
 "Into the Blue (Tracy Young Ferosh Reconstruction Dub)" — 6:55 
 Country Club Martini Crew Mixes
 "Into the Blue (Country Club Martini Crew Remix)" — 5:55
 Vanilla Ace Mix
 "Into the Blue (Vanilla Ace Remix)" — 6:22 
 Morlando Mix
 "Into the Blue (Morlando Remix)" — 6:30
 Yasutaka Nakata Mix
 "Into The Blue (Yasutaka Nakata Capsule Remix)" — 6:36

Charts

Weekly charts

Year-end charts

Release history

See also
List of number-one dance singles of 2014 (U.S.)

References

2014 singles
2014 songs
Australian electronic dance music songs
Music videos shot in London
Kylie Minogue songs
Parlophone singles
Songs written by Jacob Kasher
Songs written by Kelly Sheehan
Songs written by Mike Del Rio